Ricardo Alcerro (born 11 May 1973) is a Honduran former footballer with over 20 years of professional playing experience throughout various countries.

Career
Alcerro, nicknamed The Magician as he is best known in soccer, was selected to take part in MLS Combine for the Miami Fusion in 1998. He ended his playing career in the Puerto Rico Soccer League with Guaynabo Fluminense FC as a player/assistant coach in 2008. He was signed as a head coach and general manager with Miami United for the 2012/2013 season.
In 2014, he started a United States Soccer Federation former U14-16-18 USYMNT) scouting network. In January 2017, he was named the director of football for the Inter USA Academy. In July 2018, he was named the club's new Manager. He also became the new technical advisor at the Inter USA Academy.

References

External links
Ricardo Alcerro at Stats Crew
Ricardo Alcerro casatalentos Hondureno al servicio de Estados unidos
“Antes de usar la garra catracha, debemos manejar muy bien los conceptos modernos del fútbol”: Ricky Alcerro
"Hondurenos al Miami United"
El Fluminense Firmara Juninho y Ricardo Alcerro 
Battery Deadlocked By Islanders
USL First Division Signing Players For 2001
 "Champions League 2000"

Living people
1973 births
Honduran footballers
Honduras youth international footballers
Association football midfielders
Raleigh Flyers players
New Orleans Storm players
Cincinnati Riverhawks players
Puerto Rico Islanders players
A-League (1995–2004) players
Liga Nacional de Fútbol Profesional de Honduras players
Honduran expatriate footballers
Expatriate soccer players in the United States
Expatriate footballers in Italy
Expatriate footballers in Puerto Rico
Sportspeople from Tegucigalpa